Madame Tussauds San Francisco is a wax museum located in Fisherman's Wharf, San Francisco in California. The attraction opened on June 26, 2014 and became the 17th Madame Tussauds museum to open worldwide. The attraction features wax figures of famous figures from movies, music, politics, popular culture and sport. It also celebrates “The Spirit of San Francisco” with wax figures of local artists, musicians and activists from the city's past.

History
In 2013, Merlin Entertainments signed a lease with the Wax Museum at Fishermans Wharf  to transform the venue into both the Madame Tussauds wax attraction and the San Francisco Dungeon. The Wax Museum had operated for 50 years and had over 270 wax figures.

Notable figures

See also 
Chamber of Horrors (Madame Tussauds), London
Marie Tussaud
Madame Tussauds Hollywood
Madame Tussauds Hong Kong
Madame Tussauds Las Vegas
Madame Tussauds New York
 Madame Tussauds Rock Circus (1989–2001, London)
Madame Tussauds Delhi
Madame Tussauds Shanghai
Madame Tussauds Singapore
Madame Tussauds Sydney
Madame Tussauds Washington D.C.
Merlin Entertainments

References

Madame Tussauds
Tourist attractions in San Francisco